The Steel Cage is a 1954 American film noir drama film directed by Walter Doniger, written by Oliver Crawford, Walter Doniger, Scott Littleton, Berman Swarttz and Guy Trosper, and starring Paul Kelly, Maureen O'Sullivan, Walter Slezak, John Ireland, Lawrence Tierney and Arthur Franz. It was released in December 1954, by United Artists.

Plot

In three separate stories, San Quentin warden Duffy must contend with a crisis at the prison.

Louis, a prison cook, is about to be paroled, upsetting fellow inmate Brenner, who loves Louis's food so much that he tries to bribe him to stay behind bars. After that plan fails, a customer comes to a restaurant where Louis has been hired as chef. His insults about the dishes are so insulting, Louis smashes a plate over his head, breaking his parole. Behind prison walls again, Louis learns that Brenner's the one who sent the customer, Lee Filbert, who is now a San Quentin prisoner himself.

Ruthless convict Chet Harmon plans a breakout with help from brothers Al and Frank. A gun is planted and Chet is almost successful, taking Warden Duffy hostage, but Al has second thoughts after his brother is seriously wounded.

A mural of The Last Supper needs repair in the prison's chapel, so chaplain Harvey asks an artistically inclined inmate named Steinberg to do the restoration. Two other prisoners are sneaking in liquor through the chapel, so Steinberg demands a piece of their action. They end up taking the priest hostage as Duffy deals with a deadly confrontation.

Cast 
Paul Kelly as Warden Clinton T. Duffy
Maureen O'Sullivan as Gladys Duffy
Walter Slezak as Louis
John Ireland as Al
Lawrence Tierney as Chet Harmon
Arthur Franz as Chaplain Harvey 
Kenneth Tobey as Steinberg
George Cooper as Charlie Rivers
Alan Mowbray as Lee Filbert 
George E. Stone as Solly
Lyle Talbot as Square
Elisabeth Fraser as Marie
Stanley Andrews as Roy
Morris Ankrum as Prison Board Member Garvey
Don Beddoe as Prison Board Member Alan Ferness 
Robert Bice as Convict in Mess Hall 
George Chandler as Shorty Lanning
Ned Glass as Pete
Herb Jacobs as Convict 
Henry Kulky as George
Charles Nolte as Frank
Gene Roth as Billy Brenner
James Seay as Dr. Perry 
Charles Tannen as Convict Patient
Ben Welden as Mike

References

External links 
 

1954 films
Film noir
United Artists films
American drama films
1954 drama films
Films directed by Walter Doniger
American black-and-white films
1950s English-language films
1950s American films